Over the Rainbow is a Hong Kong modern drama series produced by TVB which premiered on 29 January 1979. The series stars Patrick Tse, Adam Cheng, Liza Wang, Carol Cheng, Alan Tam and Lau Dan, while the theme song, titled Rainbow (天虹), was composed and arranged by Joseph Koo, with lyrics provided by James Wong, and was sung by Liza Wang.

Plot
Yu Suk-foon (Leung San) was widowed at a young age and gave birth to a daughter, Yam Oi-wah (Carol Cheng). After the death of her husband, Suk-foon concentrated on developing a fashion company and became a leading figure in the fashion industry. When Oi-wah was ten years old, Suk-foon remarried to police superintendent Hong Sai-hung (Lau Dan), which discontents her father and daughter. When Oi-wah returns to Hong Kong after studying fashion design in the United Kingdom, she is determined to compete with her mother in the fashion industry, only to experience a taste of defeat in the end. Fortunately, Oi-wah was able to find comfort in her boyfriend Yu Pak-tuen (Alan Tam), who is a police officer. Suk-foon's business rival, Leung Pui-yee (Liza Wang) strikes a blow to her by hiring Oi-wah while at the bottom of her career, to compete with Suk-foon's company. At this time, To Yat-tin (Patrick Tse), former mastermind of a drug cartel, diverts his profession as a fashion company manager. To admires Pui-yee's enthusiasm and decides to lure Pui-yee in to joining his company, making Pui-yee and Oi-wah competitors in the fashion industry.

At this stage, not only has Oi-wah been emerging in the fashion industry, her relationship with Pak-tuen also matures and they announce their marriage. Pak-tuen’s superior Hong (who is also Oi-wah’s stepfather), while an honest man on the surface, is actually a corrupt officer who colludes with drug traffickers. Hong also suspects Pak-tuen to be undercover working for the ICAC. Just days before Oi-wah and Pak-tuen’s wedding, the latter was killed suddenly. Oi-wah believes her fiancé was murdered, and therefore collaborates with Pak-tuen’s good friend, lawyer Wai Ching-lap (Adam Cheng), launching a series of unraveling investigations, and eventually uncovering the unexpected culprit.

Cast
Patrick Tse as To Yat-tin (屠日天)
Adam Cheng as Wai Ching-lap (韋政立)
Liza Wang as Leung Pui-yee (梁沛怡)
Carol Cheng as Yam Oi-wah (任藹華)
Alan Tam as Yu Pak-Tuen (于柏端)
Lau Dan as Hong Sai-hung (康世雄)
Leung San as Yu Suk-foon (俞淑寬)
Kwan Hoi-san as Wong Sau-pong (黃首邦)
Stanley Fung as Sze-to Sam (司徒森)
Wong San as Uncle Kau (九叔)
Chan Ka-lin as Wong Mei-ching (黃美貞)
Kong Ngai as Cheung Moon (蔣滿)
Leung Oi as Sister Fong (芳姐)
Cheng Chi-tun as Yam Pak (任伯)
Law Kwok-hung
Mary Wong

See also
List of TVB series (1979)

1979 Hong Kong television series debuts
1979 Hong Kong television series endings
1970s Hong Kong television series
TVB dramas
Cantonese-language television shows